A divided government is a type of government in presidential systems, when control of the executive branch and the legislative branch is split between two political parties, respectively, and in semi-presidential systems, when the executive branch itself is split between two parties. The former can also occur in parliamentary systems but is often not relevant since if the executive does not satisfy or comply with the demands of parliament, parliament can force the executive to resign via a motion of no confidence.

Presidential systems
Under the separation of powers model, the state is divided into different branches. Each branch has separate and independent powers and areas of responsibility so that the powers of one branch are not in conflict with the powers associated with the others. The typical division creates an executive branch that executes and enforces the law as led by a head of state, typically a president; a legislative branch that enacts, amends, or repeals laws as led by a unicameral or bicameral legislature; and a judiciary branch that interprets and applies the law as led by a supreme court.

Divided governments are seen by different  groups as a benefit or as an undesirable product of said separations. Those in favor of divided government believe that the separations encourage more policing of those in power by the opposition, as well as limiting spending and the expansion of undesirable laws. Opponents, however, argue that divided governments become lethargic, leading to many gridlocks. In the late 1980s, Terry M. Moe, a professor of political science at Stanford University, examined the issue. He concluded that divided governments lead to compromise which can be seen as beneficial. But he also noticed that divided governments subvert performance and politicize the decisions of executive agencies. Additionally, further research has shown that during divided governments, legislatures will pass laws with sunset provisions in order to achieve a political consensus.

Early in the 20th century, divided government was rare in the United States, but since the 1970s it has become increasingly common. Divided governments are contrasted by government trifectas—a different situation in which the same party controls both the executive and legislative branches.

Semi-presidential systems
In systems with a strong president and prime minister, such as in France, divided government is known as cohabitation. In cohabitation, executive power is divided between a president of one party and a cabinet of government ministers of another. Cohabitation occurs because of the duality of the executive: an independently elected president and a prime minister who must be acceptable both to this president and to the legislature.

See also 
 Government trifecta
 Skirt and Blouse voting
Divided government in the United States
 Fusion of Powers
 Parliamentary system

References

Political science terminology